Exposure or Exposures may refer to:

People
 The Exposures, a pseudonym for German electronic musician Jan Jeline

Arts, entertainment, and media

Films
 Exposure (film), a 1932 American film
 Exposure, another name for the 1991 movie A Grande Arte starring Peter Coyote
 Exposure (sculpture) a 2010 steel frame sculpture located in the Netherlands

Literature
 Exposure (Peet novel), a 2008 sports novel by Mal Peet
 Exposure (Reichs novel), a 2014 novel in the Virals series by Kathy and Brendan Reichs
 Exposure: Poisoned Water, Corporate Greed, and One Lawyer's Twenty-Year Battle Against DuPont, a 2019 book by Robert Bilott
 Exposure, 2016 novel by Helen Dunmore
 "Exposure", written in 1918, published in 1920, poem by Wilfred Owen

Music

Albums
 Exposure (Exposé album), 1987
 Exposure (Robert Fripp album), released in 1979
 Exposure (Gary Numan album), a compilation album, 2002
 Exposure (Esperanza Spalding album), 2017
 Exposures – In Retrospect and Denial, a 2004 compilation album by metal band Dark Tranquility

Songs
 "Exposure", a song from Projector by Dark Tranquillity
 "Exposure", a song from Discoveries by Northlane
 "Exposure", a song from the self-titled 1978 album Peter Gabriel

Photography
 Exposure (photography), the quantity of light or other radiation reaching a photographic film
 Exposure value, a value given to all combinations of camera shutter speed and aperture that gives the same exposure

Television

Series
 Exposure (American TV series), a short film anthology series on Sci-Fi Channel from 2000–2002
 Exposure (British TV series), a current affairs strand on ITV which began in 2011

Episodes
 "Exposure" (Dark Angel)
 "Exposure" (The Unit)

Other uses in arts, entertainment, and media
 Exposure (magic), revealing magicians' secrets 
 Exposure, a webcomic from Red Giant Entertainment

Law
 Exposure, potential for legal damages
 Abandonment (legal), multiple meanings in law

Science and medicine

Biology and healthcare
 Exposure, in biology or medicine, contact of an organism with harm, e.g., chemicals, poor health or death due to lack of protection from extreme weather, e.g., from hypothermia or sunburn
 Radiation exposure, a measure of the ionization of air due to ionizing radiation from photons, that is, gamma rays and X-rays
 Exposure assessment, in epidemiology and risk assessment
 Exposure therapy, a treatment method for anxiety disorders
 Mere-exposure effect, a psychological artefact

Geology and topography
 Exposure (heights), in climbing and hiking, a terrain likely to cause injury when falling
 Exposure, in geology, an occurrence of a rock at the Earth's surface, an outcrop

Other uses in science and medicine
 Exposure, in physics (in particular beam experiments or flux measurements), the product of the detector mass times the duration of the experiment, sometimes also multiplied by a measure of the intensity of the incoming flux
 Radiant exposure, the radiant energy received by a surface per unit area, or equivalently the irradiance of a surface integrated over time of irradiation

Other uses
 Exposure, an insurance company's potential to provide coverage under an insurance policy
 Exposure of the dead, or sky burial
 Indecent exposure, the display of unclothed parts of the human body that is against local custom and law
 Infant exposure, a form of child abandonment
 Market exposure, a measure of the proportion of money invested in the same industry sector
 Publicity, an activity designed to rouse public interest and gain attention

See also
 Double exposure (disambiguation)
 Expose (disambiguation)
 Northern Exposure (disambiguation)
 Time exposure (disambiguation)